Akporvik Hill is a summit in North Slope Borough, Alaska, in the United States.

Akporvik is derived from an Eskimo word meaning "racetrack" or "runway".

References

Mountains of North Slope Borough, Alaska
Mountains of Alaska